Kang Kum-song (born 1 May 1998) is a North Korean freestyle wrestler. He won silver in the men's 57kg division at the 18th Asian Games in Jakarta-Palembang, Indonesia, 2018.

References

External links
 FILA profile

1998 births
Living people
North Korean male sport wrestlers
Wrestlers at the 2018 Asian Games
Medalists at the 2018 Asian Games
Asian Games silver medalists for North Korea
Asian Games medalists in wrestling
21st-century North Korean people